The first season of RuPaul's Drag Race Down Under began airing on 1 May and concluded on 19 June 2021.

Ten Australian and New Zealand-based drag queens competed for the title of the "Down Under's first Drag Superstar", a one-year supply of Revolution Beauty Cosmetics, and a cash prize of $30,000. The winner of the first season of RuPaul's Drag Race Down Under was Kita Mean, with Art Simone, Karen from Finance and Scarlet Adams as runners-up.

Production
Initially announced as a solely Australian version in 2019, production was moved to New Zealand due to the COVID-19 pandemic in Australia. Filmed in Auckland, the series features drag queens from both Australia and New Zealand competing to be "Down Under's first Drag Superstar".

Australian comedian Rhys Nicholson was confirmed to join RuPaul and Michelle Visage as a judge. They officially announced the ten contestants at the Sydney Gay and Lesbian Mardi Gras on 6 March 2021.

The three New Zealand-based queens were on House of Drag, with Anita Wigl'it and Kita Mean as judges and Elektra Shock as the runner-up on season 2.

Contestants 

Ages, names, and cities stated are at time of filming.

Contestant progress

Lip syncs
Legend:

Guest judges
Listed in chronological order:

Elz Carrad, New Zealand actor
Rena Owen, New Zealand actress in theatre, television and film

Special guests
Guests who appeared in episodes, but did not judge on the main stage.

Episode 1 
Taika Waititi, New Zealand film and television director

Episode 2 
Kylie Minogue, Australian singer and actress
Dannii Minogue, Australian singer and actress

Episode 3 
Troye Sivan, Australian singer-songwriter
Leland, American singer

Episode 5 
Suzanne Paul, infomercial hostess and television presenter

Episode 6 
Aunty Donna, Australian absurdist comedy group from Melbourne

Episode 7 
Raven, American drag queen and runner-up on both the second season of RuPaul's Drag Race and the first season of All Stars
The Veronicas, Australian pop duo from Brisbane

Episode 8 
 Dame Olivia Newton-John, British-Australian singer, songwriter, actress, entrepreneur and activist
Chloe Lattanzi, American singer and actress, daughter to Dame Olivia Newton-John
 Lance Savali, New Zealand dancer/choreographer from Wellington

Episodes

Controversies
Following the cast reveal, video footage and images surfaced of Scarlet Adams "wearing a shirt with the Aboriginal flag, with dark tanned skin and two teeth blacked out". Guardian Australia reported that the image was taken in 2012 during Australia Day celebrations. Other images feature Adams in blackface as an African American woman and playing Asian stereotypes by wearing a sari as part of a Bollywood character. Adams apologised via social media in 2020 before being revealed as a cast member and later released a new apology in March 2021. In the series fifth episode, RuPaul addressed the controversy during the judges' critiques. Adams said, “I can’t deny that that happened. As a dumb, ignorant teenager, I made some mistakes that I’m really not proud of, and every day, I regret those decisions, I regret the fact that I used my platform as a performer to ridicule people who have faced systemic racism for hundreds of years and I’m so ashamed of the person I once was. I’m really sorry to you and to everyone that I have hurt.”

Another contestant, Karen from Finance, was also reported to be involved in racial insensitivity after photos emerged showing a tattoo of a golliwog. Karen from Finance addressed the controversy on their social media by saying "I made the uninformed, ignorant and regrettable decision to have one of these dolls tattooed. In the years that followed ... I realised how irresponsible and stupid I had been so I disposed of the dolls to landfill and had my tattoo covered."

Art Simone's return to the competition in Episode 4 also led to accusations of racism, with the show's lack of explanation for Simone's return leading to some viewers to question why a white contestant was allowed to return, but not the two recently eliminated contestants of colour.

Etcetera Etcetera's performance as Lindy Chamberlain-Creighton in the Snatch Game (episode 2) draw widespread condemnation, as her impersonation heavily mocked the death of Chamberlain's baby daughter, accompanied with a bloodstained dingo puppet, which was criticised as being cruel, offensive and insensitive considering how Chamberlain-Creighton was wrongfully convicted for her daughter's death.

Certain jokes made by Anita Wigl'it about Prince Andrew during her Snatch Game appearance as Elizabeth II in Episode Two were censored by the BBC for the UK screenings of the episode. Wigl'it was later accused of plagiarism by Australian comedian Anthony Lehmann, who claimed that Wigl'it stole a joke that he had originally cracked in August 2020. Wigl'it later issued an apology on her Instagram, saying “Oh no! I do apologise!! When I was doing research for the Queen character I knew that there was something funny about the letter writing[...]Friends suggested the text. Turns out they had heard it somewhere before!”

Awards and nominations

References

External links

  (Australia)
  (New Zealand)

2021 Australian television seasons
2021 in LGBT history
2021 in New Zealand television
Impact of the COVID-19 pandemic on the LGBT community
Television series impacted by the COVID-19 pandemic
Race-related controversies in television
RuPaul's Drag Race Down Under seasons